The 1995 Scheldeprijs was the 82nd edition of the Scheldeprijs cycle race and was held on 19 April 1995. The race was won by Rossano Brasi of the Polti team.

General classification

References

1995
1995 in road cycling
1995 in Belgian sport